Mohamed Abdelaziz Elsayed Abdelkawy (born November 30, 1995) is a Qatari professional basketball player.  He currently plays for Al Rayyan Doha of the Qatari Basketball League and the FIBA Asia Champions Cup.

He represented Qatar's national basketball team at the 2016 FIBA Asia Challenge in Tehran, Iran.

References

External links
 Asia-basket.com Profile
 2016 FIBA Asia Challenge Profile
 2015 FIBA Champions Cup Profile

1995 births
Living people
Point guards
People from Doha
Qatari men's basketball players
Basketball players at the 2018 Asian Games
Asian Games competitors for Qatar